Udoma Udo Udoma  is Nigeria's Former Minister of Budget and National Planning and the son of Late Sir Egbert Udo Udoma. He is also the founding partner of Udo Udoma & Belo Osagie - one of Nigeria's oldest and largest commercial law firms.

Education
Udoma attended Corona School, Ikoyi, Lagos from 1962 to 1964 and Nakasoro Primary School, Kampala, Uganda from 1964 to 1965. He attended King's College, Lagos for his secondary education from 1966 to 1972 and after his A levels proceeded to St. Catherine's College, Oxford, England where he obtained a B.A. (Law) degree in 1976 and a B.C.L. degree in jurisprudence in 1977. He was called to the Nigerian Bar Association in 1978, after obtaining a B.L. degree at the Nigerian Law School.

Senate career
He was elected Senator for the Akwa-Ibom South constituency of Akwa-Ibom State, Nigeria at the start of the Nigerian Fourth Republic, running on the People's Democratic Party (PDP) platform. He took office on 29 May 1999.
He was reelected in April 2003, again running on the PDP platform.
After taking his seat in the Senate in June 1999, he was appointed to committees on Public Accounts, Judiciary, Banking & Currency, Science & technology, Privatization and Drug & Narcotics (vice chairman).

Federal cabinet minister
On 11 November 2015, Udoma was appointed the Minister of Budget and Planning by President Muhammadu Buhari. He served in this role until 2019.

References

Federal ministers of Nigeria
Living people
People from Akwa Ibom State
Peoples Democratic Party members of the Senate (Nigeria)
King's College, Lagos alumni
20th-century Nigerian politicians
21st-century Nigerian politicians
Alumni of St Catherine's College, Oxford
1954 births